Baklava is a world music acoustic band. Their key challenge is to create original music based on the aesthetic achievements of traditional Macedonian music. The band held several concerts in Europe and participated in several festivals, including the renowned Skopje Jazz Festival, Sfinks Festival in Belgium and other countries.

Band members
Elena Hristova, vocals
Sibo, daf and other percussions

Discography

Baklava (2006)
Kalemar (2008)
Me Mankas Mucho (2011)

References

External links
Baklava's website 

Macedonian musical groups